Genista canariensis is a species of flowering plant in the legume family Fabaceae, known by the common names Canary broom, Canary Islands broom or florist's genista. It is native to the Canary Islands, but it grows as an introduced species in mainland Europe, especially Spain, and on other continents. It has been introduced to California and Washington State in the US. The leaves are made up of oval-shaped blue-green leaflets each up to a centimeter long and densely hairy on the undersides. The raceme inflorescence holds up to 20 bright yellow pea-like flowers. The fruit is a legume pod one to two centimeters long containing several dark brown seeds.

In cultivation in the UK this plant has gained the Royal Horticultural Society’s Award of Garden Merit.

References

External links

 Jepson Manual Treatment
 Photo gallery

canariensis
Endemic flora of Macaronesia
Flora of the Canary Islands
Plants described in 1753
Taxa named by Carl Linnaeus